The export of cryptography is the transfer from one country to another of devices and technology related to cryptography.

In the early days of the Cold War, the United States and its allies developed an elaborate series of export control regulations designed to prevent a wide range of Western technology from falling into the hands of others, particularly the Eastern bloc. All export of technology classed as 'critical' required a license. CoCom was  organized to coordinate Western export controls.

Currently, many countries, notably those participating in the Wassenaar Arrangement, have similar restrictions. The Wassenaar restrictions are largely loosensed in the late 2010s.

References

See also
 Export of cryptography from the United States
 Restrictions on the import of cryptography

Export and import control of cryptography
Computer law